Atanasije "Tanasije" Čarapić or Atanasije "Tanasko" Čarapić (Serbian: Танасије Чарапић; 1770 – 1810) was the Voivode or Duke of Gročka Nahiya (Duke of the Principality of Gročka Nahiya since 1806, the height of the Serbian Revolution.

The  were among the first to join Karađorđe against the dahijas.

Biography
Tanasije Čarapić, the younger brother of Duke Vasa Čarapić, came originally from Beli Potok near Avala. He was killed in the battle of Prahovo in 1810. His wife was Ivana (cousin of Karađorđe's wife Jelena), who had sons Đorđe and Marko, and daughters Jeka (married in Boleč), Marta (married in Ivanča), Đurđija and Petrija (married in Ripanj). Tanasije Čarapić had a house in Belgrade's Dorćol district, below Pirinčana, the ruins of a palace once belonging to an Austrian commander of Belgrade in the 18th century named "Palace of Prince Evgenije" (Duke Alexander of Wüttemberg) in today's Dušanova Street, which was then the main street in Čaršija.

The tomb of Atanasije Čarapić is located near the Serbian Orthodox Church of Poreč, the old name for Donji Milanovac.

Sources
 Milan Đ. Milićević, Pomenik znamenitih ljudi u srpskog narodu novijega doba, Vol 1 (Belgrade, 1888)
 Milan Đ. Milićević,Kneževina Srbija (Belgrade, 1878)

See also
 List of Serbian Revolutionaries

References 

People of the First Serbian Uprising
Serbian revolutionaries
19th-century Serbian people
Serbian military personnel killed in action
1770 births
1810 deaths